Linden Park is a suburb of Adelaide, South Australia in the City of Burnside.
It derives its name from the Linden Tree.

Many of its streets are named after British First Sea Lords and admiralty, such as:

 Hood st: Samuel Hood, 1st Viscount Hood
 Keyes st: Roger Keyes, 1st Baron Keyes
 Sturdee st: Doveton Sturdee
 Jellicoe st: John Jellicoe, 1st Earl Jellicoe
 Beatty st: David Beatty, 1st Earl Beatty
 Wemyss st: Rosslyn Wemyss, 1st Baron Wester Wemyss
 Hay Rd: Lord John Hay

References

Suburbs of Adelaide